The defense readiness condition (DEFCON) is an alert state used by the United States Armed Forces.

The DEFCON system was developed by the Joint Chiefs of Staff (JCS) and unified and specified combatant commands. It prescribes five graduated levels of readiness (or states of alert) for the U.S. military. It increases in severity from DEFCON 5 (least severe) to DEFCON 1 (most severe) to match varying military situations, with DEFCON 1 signalling the outbreak of nuclear warfare.

DEFCONs are a subsystem of a series of Alert Conditions, or LERTCONs, which also include Emergency Conditions (EMERGCONs).

Definition
The DEFCON level is controlled primarily by the U.S. president and the U.S. Secretary of Defense through the Chairman of the Joint Chiefs of Staff and the Combatant Commanders; each  level defines specific security, activation and response scenarios for the personnel in question.

Different branches of the U.S. Armed Forces (i.e. U.S. Army, U.S. Navy, U.S. Air Force, U.S. Marine Corps, U.S. Coast Guard, U.S. Space Force) and different bases or command groups can be activated at different defense conditions. According to Air & Space/Smithsonian, the U.S. DEFCON level has never been more severe than DEFCON 3. The DEFCON 2 levels in the 1962 Cuban Missile Crisis and 1991 Gulf War applied only to the U.S. Strategic Air Command (SAC).

DEFCONs should not be confused with similar systems used by the U.S. military, such as Force Protection Conditions (FPCONS), Readiness Conditions (REDCONS), Information Operations Condition (INFOCON) and its future replacement Cyber Operations Condition (CYBERCON), and Watch Conditions (WATCHCONS), or the former Homeland Security Advisory System used by the U.S. Department of Homeland Security.

Levels
Defense readiness conditions vary between many commands and have changed over time, and the United States Department of Defense uses exercise terms when referring to the DEFCON levels during exercises. This is to preclude the possibility of confusing exercise commands with actual operational commands. On January 12, 1966, NORAD "proposed the adoption of the readiness conditions of the JCS system", and information about the levels was declassified in 2006:

History
After NORAD was created, the command used different readiness levels (Normal, Increased, Maximum) subdivided into eight conditions, e.g., the "Maximum Readiness" level had two conditions "Air Defense Readiness" and "Air Defense Emergency".  In October 1959, the JCS Chairman informed NORAD "that Canada and the U.S. had signed an agreement on increasing the operational readiness of NORAD forces during periods of international tension." After the agreement became effective on October 2, 1959, the JCS defined a system with DEFCONs in November 1959 for the military commands. The initial DEFCON system had "Alpha" and "Bravo" conditions (under DEFCON 3) and Charlie/Delta under DEFCON 4, plus an "Emergency" level higher than DEFCON 1 with two conditions: "Defense Emergency" and the highest, "Air Defense Emergency" ("Hot Box" and "Big Noise" for exercises).

Instances of DEFCON 2 or 3

DEFCON 2

Cuban Missile Crisis
During the Cuban Missile Crisis on October 16–28, 1962, the U.S. Armed Forces (with the exception of United States Army Europe (USAREUR)) were ordered to DEFCON 3. On October 24, Strategic Air Command (SAC) was ordered to DEFCON 2, while the rest of the U.S. Armed Forces remained at DEFCON 3. SAC remained at DEFCON 2 until November 15.

Persian Gulf War
On January 15, 1991, the Joint Chiefs of Staff declared DEFCON 2 in the opening phase of Operation Desert Storm during the Persian Gulf War.

DEFCON 3

Yom Kippur War
On October 6, 1973, Egypt and Syria launched a joint attack on Israel resulting in the Yom Kippur War. The United States became concerned that the Soviet Union might intervene, and on October 25, US forces, including Strategic Air Command, Continental Air Defense Command, European Command and the Sixth Fleet, were placed at DEFCON 3.

According to documents declassified in 2016, the move to DEFCON 3 was motivated by CIA reports indicating that the Soviet Union had sent a ship to Egypt carrying nuclear weapons along with two other amphibious vessels. Soviet troops never landed and the declassified documents did not disclose the fate of the ship and its cargo.

Over the following days, the various forces reverted to normal status with the Sixth Fleet standing down on November 17.

Operation Paul Bunyan

Following the axe murder incident at Panmunjom on August 18, 1976, readiness levels for US forces in South Korea were increased to DEFCON 3, where they remained throughout Operation Paul Bunyan.

September 11 attacks
During the September 11 attacks, Secretary of Defense Donald Rumsfeld ordered the DEFCON level be increased to 3, and also a stand-by for a possible increase to DEFCON 2. It was lowered to DEFCON 4 on September 14.

See also
 COGCON – Continuity of government readiness level
 Combat readiness
 Doomsday Clock
 HURCON – Hurricane Condition threat rating (military-developed scale)
 National Command Authority (United States)
 National Military Command Center
 National Terrorism Advisory System
 UK Threat Levels – Similar British system used for terrorism threats

References

External links 
 

Alert measurement systems